"Save My Soul" is the title of a 2004 single by the American Dance singer Kristine W. It was released as the second single from her album Fly Again. In April 2004, "Save My Soul" was Kristine W's eighth consecutive number one song on the Billboard Hot Dance Club Play chart, which broke a previous record for consecutive number ones on this chart once held by Madonna and Janet Jackson. The song was a featured single at the White Party in Palm Springs, California in April 2005.

The swing group Big Bad Voodoo Daddy recorded the song on their album titled Save My Soul.

Remixes
 Save My Soul (Gabriel and Dresden remix) 09:49
 Save My Soul (Cypher UK Mix) 7:36
 Save My Soul (Junior Vasquez's Sound Factory Mix) 6:47
 Save My Soul (Mike Cruz Club Mix) 8:16
 Save My Soul (Orange Factory Extended Mix) 6:32

See also
List of number-one dance hits (United States)

References

2004 singles
Kristine W songs
Tommy Boy Records singles
2003 songs